Edgardo Smith Abdala Montero (born July 1, 1978) is a Chilean-born Palestinian former professional footballer who last played for Fernández Vial. and the Palestinian national team.

Personal life
He is the father of the Chilean footballer Joaquín Abdala.

References

External links
 
 
 
 Edgardo Abdala at BDFA.com.ar 

People from Monte Águila
1978 births
Living people
People from Bío Bío Province
Chilean people of Palestinian descent
Citizens of the State of Palestine through descent
Chilean footballers
Chilean football managers
Chilean emigrants to Palestine
Palestinian footballers
Palestinian football managers
Palestine international footballers
Palestinian expatriate footballers
Club Deportivo Palestino footballers
Ñublense footballers
C.D. Huachipato footballers
Unión San Felipe footballers
Santiago Morning footballers
Naval de Talcahuano footballers
C.D. Arturo Fernández Vial footballers
Expatriate footballers in Chile
Chilean Primera División players
Association football midfielders

Doping cases in association football